Silver Lake, sometimes Silverlake, is an unincorporated community in Cowlitz County, Washington, in the southwestern portion of the state. The closest cities to the subject property are Castle Rock, six miles (10 km) to the west, and Toutle, four miles (6 km) east.

The Silver Lake community takes its name from the lake of the same name, which it lies on the northwest shore of. The Silver Lake community is part of the Toutle Lake School District, a K-12 school district of about 600 students. The eruption of Mount St. Helens on May 18, 1980 was the deadliest and most economically destructive volcanic event in the history of the United States. The WDFW has planted grass carp in this lake. The grass carp have lived far longer than expected, and have destroyed much of the beneficial native vegetation. It is now legal to fish for or retain grass carp.

Silverlake also describes the associated marsh. It is home to a nature trail, and the visitor center for the Mount St. Helens National Volcanic Monument.

Geography

Economy
Employment in the area is primarily centered on the cities of Longview, Kelso, and Castle Rock, which are all situated along the Interstate-5 freeway. The regional economy rests mainly on timber and tourism, but the latter has taken precedence since the decline of the timber industry. Local economic growth has remained stable due to the plethora of outdoor activities take place in the scenic Silverlake area, including camping, hunting, and fishing.  Additionally, the Pacific Ocean is approximately 90 minutes west and skiing and other wilderness activities are all within an hour away.

Transport
Silverlake is served by one major road, Spirit Lake Memorial Highway, which joins I-5 in Castle Rock to the west and runs east to the US Forest Services’ Mount Saint Helens Observatory at Johnston Ridge. This highway is a two-directional arterial heading west and east with both residential and commercial development areas running alongside it. Major shopping, dining and commercial properties are located up and down the I-5 corridor.

Services
Silverlake is not an incorporated town, but relies primarily on Castle Rock and the town of Toutle for schools and services.  Cowlitz County provides most services including police, fire, ambulance, water, sewer, and garbage.  Gas service is provided by Cascade Natural Gas while CenturyLink and Frontier Communications provide telephone service.  The area is composed of a mixture of uses that range from single-family and multi-family residential, commercial, retail, and agricultural uses. Traffic volume along Silver Lake remains consistent with approximately 1,000 cars passing it per day.

Lake
Camping, fishing, and boating also available at Silverlake Resort, Silver Cove RV Resort, Streeters Resort, and Mt. St. Helens RV Resort.

External links
Toutle Lake School District website

References

Unincorporated communities in Cowlitz County, Washington
Unincorporated communities in Washington (state)
Landforms of Cowlitz County, Washington
Wetlands of Washington (state)
Marshes of the United States
Protected areas of Cowlitz County, Washington